(formerly Gunma Shikishima Athletic Stadium, renamed on June 1, 2008 for naming rights) is a multi-purpose stadium in Maebashi, Japan.  It is currently used mostly for football matches. Sponsored by soy sauce maker Shoda Shoyu, which has its headquarters in nearby Tatebayashi, the stadium serves as a home ground of Thespakusatsu Gunma. The stadium holds 19,000 people.

References 

 J. League website

Football venues in Japan
Athletics (track and field) venues in Japan
Multi-purpose stadiums in Japan
Thespakusatsu Gunma
Sports venues in Gunma Prefecture
Maebashi
1951 establishments in Japan
Sports venues completed in 1951